Opomyza petrei is a species of fly in the family Opomyzidae. It is found in the  Palearctic.

References

Opomyzidae
Insects described in 1934
Muscomorph flies of Europe